Pop Keeney Stadium is an outdoor stadium in Bothell, Washington, a suburb northeast of Seattle. It hosts high school football games for several high schools in the region, including Inglemoor, North Creek High School, Woodinville, and Bothell High School. Pop Keeney has also hosted both mens lacrosse games aswell as state soccer playoffs for both boys and girls.

The stadium is named after Harold 'Pop' Keeney, Bothell's first football coach, and a member of one of Bothell's pioneer families.

In 2008, several Bothell high school alumni began raising money for a new replay-capable scoreboard. Donations arrived from all around the country, raising $160,000 altogether. The scoreboard was installed in 2009 as only the second of its kind in the state.

The Northshore 2010 Capital Projects Bond included a project to renovate the stadium, including updates to lighting, stands, and other facilities.

In 2016, the McMenamins restaurant/hotel/brewery complex opened in the buildings of the W. A. Anderson School next to Pop Keeney Stadium.  It is now a common pre-game tailgate location for many fans attending games at the stadium.

In 2019, the Seattle Seahawks announced they would hold one special practice, on Aug 3, at Pop Keeney Stadium in Bothell. The practice included performances by the Seahawks Dancers and Blue Thunder drum line as well as photo opportunities with team mascots Blitz and Boom.

References

Sports venues in Washington (state)
Buildings and structures in Bothell, Washington
1920 establishments in Washington (state)
Sports venues completed in 1920
Soccer venues in Washington (state)
American football venues in Washington (state)
High school football venues in the United States